The 1960 American Football League season was the inaugural regular season of the AFL. It consisted of 8 franchises split into two divisions: the East Division (Buffalo Bills, Houston Oilers, Titans of New York, Boston Patriots) and the West Division (Los Angeles Chargers, Denver Broncos, Dallas Texans, Oakland Raiders).

The season ended when the Houston Oilers defeated the Los Angeles Chargers 24–16 in the inaugural AFL Championship game.

Division races
The AFL had 8 teams, grouped into two divisions.  Each team would play a home-and-away game against the other 7 teams in the league for a total of 14 games, and the best team in the Eastern Division would play against the best in the Western Division in a championship game.  If there was a tie in the standings at the top of either division, a one-game playoff would be held to determine the division winner.

The Denver Broncos, who would not have a winning season until they went 7–5–2 in 1973, were the Western Division leaders halfway through 1960.  They won the AFL's first game, played on Friday night, September 9, 1960, beating the Boston Patriots 13–10.  The Patriots' Gino Cappelletti scored the AFL's first points with a 35-yard field goal.  Other results in Week One were the Los Angeles Chargers 21–20 win over the Dallas Texans, the Houston Oilers 37–22 win over the Oakland Raiders, and the Titans of New York 27–3 win over the Buffalo Bills.  In the Raiders game, J. D. Smith caught a pass from Tom Flores to score the first two-point conversion in pro football history.

In Week Eight (October 30), Denver lost to the visiting Texans, 17–14, and did not win any of their last eight games, finishing with the AFL's worst record at 4–9–1.  The Chargers, still in Los Angeles, pulled ahead the next week with a Friday night win over the Titans of New York, 21–7, and finished at 10–4–0.  The Eastern Division lead was held by Houston, except for a setback from a 14–13 loss to Oakland on September 25.  In Week Five, the Oilers beat the visiting Titans, 27–21 and led the rest of the way.

Regular season

Results of the 1960 AFL season

Standings

Playoffs

Statistics

Quarterback

Awards
AP AFL Player of The Year: Abner Haynes, Dallas Texans 
UPI AFL Player of The Year: Abner Haynes, Dallas Texans

Stadiums
The AFL began play with the following stadiums:

AFL Eastern Division
Boston: Nickerson Field
Buffalo: War Memorial Stadium
Houston: Jeppesen Stadium
New York: Polo Grounds

AFL Western Division
Dallas: Cotton Bowl
Denver: Bears Stadium
Los Angeles: Los Angeles Memorial Coliseum
Oakland: Kezar Stadium in San Francisco

Coaches
The AFL began play with the following head coaches:

AFL Eastern Division
Boston: Lou Saban
Buffalo: Buster Ramsey
Houston: Lou Rymkus
New York: Sammy Baugh

AFL Western Division
Dallas: Hank Stram
Denver: Frank Filchock
Los Angeles: Sid Gillman
Oakland: Eddie Erdelatz

External links
Football Database

 
American Football League seasons